This a list of episodes for NWA Powerrr, a weekly professional wrestling series produced by the National Wrestling Alliance (NWA). Each season focuses on storylines leading into the NWA's pay-per-view events. Episodes from Powerrr'''s companion series, Powerrr Surge'', are also listed.

Series overview

Episode list

Season 1: Into the Fire

Season 2: Hard Times

Season 3: Crockett Cup 2020

Season 4: When Our Shadows Fall

Season 5: EmPowerrr & NWA 73

Season 6: Hard Times 2

Season 7: Crockett Cup 2022

Season 8: Alwayz Ready

Season 9: NWA 74

Season 10: Hard Times 3

Season 11: Nuff Said

Season 12: NWA 312

List of NWA Powerrr Surge episodes

References

External links
 Official NWA website

 Official NWA YouTube channel

2019 American television series debuts
2020s American television series
National Wrestling Alliance shows
American professional wrestling television series
American non-fiction web series
English-language television shows
Facebook
YouTube original programming